The 2nd Pennsylvania House of Representatives District is represented by Democratic Representative Robert E. Merski.  The seat was represented by Democratic Representative Florindo J. Fabrizio until his death on July 24, 2018. The seat was vacant pending a special election.

District profile 
The 2nd Pennsylvania House of Representatives District is located in Erie County and includes the following areas:
 Erie
 Ward 05
 Greene Township
 Harborcreek Township
 Wesleyville

Representatives

Recent election results

External links
District map from the United States Census Bureau
Pennsylvania House Legislative District Maps from the Pennsylvania Redistricting Commission.  
Population Data for District 44 from the Pennsylvania Redistricting Commission.

References

Government of Erie County, Pennsylvania
Erie, Pennsylvania
2